Kyzylkuper (Qıźılküper) is a rural locality (a village) in Gorkovsky Selsoviet, Kushnarenkovsky District, Bashkortostan, Russia. The population was 82 as of 2010. There is 1 streets.

Geography 
Kyzylkuper is located 36 km northwest of Kushnarenkovo (the district's administrative centre) by road. Ilikovo is the nearest rural locality.

References 

Rural localities in Kushnarenkovsky District